Diafounou Gory is commune in the Cercle of Yélimané in the Kayes Region of south-western Mali. The main town (chef-lieu) is Tambacara. In 2009 the commune had a population of 20,292.

References

External links
.
.

Communes of Kayes Region